SS Fort Mercer was a Type T2-SE-A1 tanker built by Sun Shipbuilding & Drydock Co., at Chester, Pennsylvania in October 1945. SS Fort Mercer (hull number 534), was built under a Maritime Commission contract and launched on October 2, 1945. With World War II ending on August 15, 1945, Fort Mercer did not serve in the war. Fort Mercer was owned and operated by the Trinidad Corporation of New York.

Loss and aftermath

Captain Frederick Paetzel radioed out for help, reporting  waves were hitting the ship. When she broke in two, nine officers and crew were on the bow section and 34 crewmen were on the stern section, with the radio and engine still working. A Coast Guard PBY aircraft out of Coast Guard Air Station Salem was sent to look for the ship, but did not find it.
Only five members of Fort Mercers 43 man crew were lost, all trapped in the sinking bow.

The stern of Fort Mercer, which remained afloat, was towed to Newport, Rhode Island, outfitted with a new bow and rechristened San Jacinto.  The new ship was  longer and expanded from 26 tanks to 29 tanks. The ship again split in half in 1964 and again was rebuilt, renamed this time The Pasadena.  The Pasadena was partially salvaged and mostly scrapped in 1983. 

Daring rescues by the Coast Guard Lifeboat CG 36500 carried out of Pendletons stern 32 survivors of 33. After grounding, Pendletons bow was boarded a week later. Of the eight victims stranded on this section, only one frozen body was recovered.

See also
 Daniel Webster Cluff  United States Coast Guard officer
 The Finest Hours - Movie

References

Oilers
1945 ships
Type T2-SE-A1 tankers of the United States Navy
World War II tankers of the United States
Ships built by the Sun Shipbuilding & Drydock Company
Shipwrecks of the Massachusetts coast
Maritime incidents in 1952
World War II merchant ships of the United States
Maritime incidents in 1964